= Fraternity prank =

Fraternity prank may refer to:

- Hazing, various initiation rituals and other activities
- Practical joke, a mischievous trick played on a person
